Eremitis is a genus of bamboo plants in the grass family, that is endemic to Brazil.

The only known species is Eremitis parviflora, native to the States of Bahia, Pernambuco, Rio de Janeiro, and Espirito Santo in eastern Brazil.

References

Bambusoideae
Endemic flora of Brazil
Grasses of Brazil
Flora of the Atlantic Forest
Flora of Bahia
Flora of Espírito Santo
Flora of Rio de Janeiro (state)
Flora of Pernambuco
Monotypic Poaceae genera
Bambusoideae genera